Roßtal is a market town in the district of Fürth, Bavaria, Germany. As of 2020 it had a population of 10,127. It has a primary school and a secondary school. The church is named St. Laurentius and was built from 1025 to 1042.

Surrounded by beautiful forests, made accessible via many hiking and biking trails, Roßtal is a place for those who love nature and the outdoors. Roßtal has easy trainklinks to Nuremberg and Ansbach which runs 3 times an hour.

References

External links

 

Fürth (district)